HMS Sirdar was an S-class submarine built for the Royal Navy during the Second World War, and part of the Third Group built of that class.  She was built by Scotts, of Greenock and launched on 26 March 1943.

Design and description

The S-class submarines were designed to patrol the restricted waters of the North Sea and the Mediterranean Sea. The third batch was slightly enlarged and improved over the preceding second batch of the S-class. They displaced  on the surface and  submerged. The S-class submarines had a crew of 48 officers and ratings.

For surface running, the boats were powered by two  diesel engines, each driving one propeller shaft. When submerged each propeller was driven by a  electric motor. They could reach  on the surface and  underwater.

The boats were armed with seven 21-inch (533 mm) torpedo tubes. A half-dozen of these were in the bow and there was one external tube in the stern. They carried six reload torpedoes for the bow tubes for a total of thirteen torpedoes. Twelve mines could be carried in lieu of the internally stowed torpedoes. They were also armed with a 3-inch (76 mm) deck gun. It is uncertain if Sirdar was completed with a  Oerlikon light AA gun or had one added later. The third-batch S-class boats were fitted with either a Type 129AR or 138 ASDIC system and a Type 291 or 291W early-warning radar.

Wartime career

In 1943 Sirdar made an involuntary dive to a depth of over 380 feet when she became out of control on an exercise with Tony Spender in command. She hit the muddy bottom and became stuck for a while until finally surfacing attempts were successful.  Sirdar spent most of the war in the Pacific Far East, where she sank two Japanese coasters, two sailing vessels, two unidentified vessels, and the Japanese guardboat Kaiyo Maru No.5. She also damaged another coaster with gunfire.

Postwar career

She survived the Second World War, and continued in service.  Along with her sisters, HMS Scorcher and Scythian, Sirdar took part in the search for the missing HMS Affray in 1951.  They all flew large white flags to distinguish them from the missing Affray. Sirdar later sat on the bottom for six hours while the ASDIC boats familiarised themselves with the identification of a submarine sitting on the bottom.

On the night of 31 January/1 February 1953, Sirdar was in dry dock at the naval dockyard at Sheerness, Kent when Sheerness was struck by the North Sea flood of 1953. Flood waters caused lock gates to fail, flooding the dry dock holding Sirdar and causing her to capsize. She was refloated and returned to service.

Sirdar was eventually sold, and arrived at the yards of McLellen on 31 May 1965 for breaking up.

Notes

References
 
  
 
 

 

British S-class submarines (1931)
1943 ships
World War II submarines of the United Kingdom
Maritime incidents in 1953